Liezel Huber and Rachel McQuillan were the defending champions, but none of them competed this year. Huber played in the Kremlin Cup at the same week.

Shinobu Asagoe and Nana Miyagi won the title by defeating Svetlana Kuznetsova and Arantxa Sánchez Vicario 6–4, 4–6, 6–4 in the final. It was the 2nd title for Asagoe and the 19th title for Miyagi in their respective doubles careers.

Seeds

Draw

Draw

External link
 WTA tournament draws

Doubles